Land Arts of the American West is a studio-based field program that seeks to construct an expanded definition of land art through direct experience connecting the full range of human interventions in the landscape—from pre-contact indigenous to contemporary practice. Land art includes everything from constructing a road, to taking a walk, building a monument, and leaving a mark in the sand. The program seeks to expand upon connections between typically separate fields. Each fall we spend two months camping while traveling 7,000 miles to engage sites that range from the CLUI complex at Wendover, Utah to the pottery culture at Mata Ortiz, Mexico, from earth works like Robert Smithson's Spiral Jetty to archeological sites like Chaco Canyon. We learn from the fact that Donald Judd surrounded himself with both contemporary sculpture and Navajo rugs; that Chaco Canyon and Roden Crater function as celestial instruments; and that the Very Large Array is a scientific research center with a powerful aesthetic presence on the land. We spend the semester living and working in the landscape with guest scholars that expand the range of our definition in disciplines including archeology, art history, architecture, ceramics, criticism, writing, design, and studio art. The immersive nature of how we experience the landscape triggers an amalgamated body of inquiry where students have the opportunity of time and space to develop authority in their work through direct action and reflection. Land Arts hinges on the primacy of first person experience and the realization that human-land relationships are rarely singular.

Land Arts of the American West started at the University of New Mexico by artist Bill Gilbert in 2000 and developed as a collaboration between Gilbert and architect Chris Taylor since 2001. From 2002-2008 Land Arts was co-sponsored by the University of New Mexico and the University of Texas at Austin where Taylor taught in the interdisciplinary design program of the Department of Art and Art History. In 2007 Taylor was invited by Incubo to bring together a group of students and professionals from Chile and the United States for a symposium in Santiago and a Land Arts exploration of the Atacama Desert. In 2008 Taylor began teaching in the College of Architecture at Texas Tech University where Land Arts continues to develop in addition to the programming at the University of New Mexico. The program now operates autonomously from both institutions. Operational funding for Land Arts of the American West is provided in part by Lannan Foundation and Andrea Nasher.

The book Land Arts of the American West documents the history and development of the program was published by the University of Texas Press in April 2009.

Program directors
 Bill Gilbert, Department of Art and Art History, University of New Mexico
 Chris Taylor, College of Architecture, Texas Tech University

Sites visited
 Arizona: Chiricahua Mountains, Coolidge Dam, Fire Point, Point Sublime, Grand Canyon, Roden Crater.
 New Mexico: Anaya Springs, Chaco Canyon, Bisti Badlands, Bosque del Apache Cabinetlandia, Cebolla Canyon, El Vado Lake, Gila Cliff Dwellings, Jackpile Mine at Laguna Pueblo, Madrid, Mimbres River, Otero Mesa, Plains of San Agustin, Sawtooth Mountains, The Lightning Field, Turkey Creek, Three Rivers, Twin Buttes, Mount Withington, Very Large Array, Wild Rivers.
 Nevada: Double Negative, Goshute Canyon Wilderness, Hoover Dam, Lake Mead.
 Mexico: Mata Ortiz.
 Texas: Boquillas Canyon, El Cosmico, Huaco Tanks, Land Heritage Institute, Lubbock, Marfa - Chinati Foundation and Judd Foundation, Presidio - Adobe Alliance.
 Utah: Blue Notch at Lake Powell, CLUI Wendover, Goblin Valley, Horse Tanks, Horseshoe Canyon, Intrepid Potash, Moon House, Muley Point, Spiral Jetty, Sun Tunnels.

Past field guests
Past field guests include Nick Abdalla, Tori Arpad, Joe Arredondo, Steve Badgett, Charles Bowden, Penelope Boyer, Jerry Brody, Chris Calott, Matt Coolidge, Rick Dingus, Intrepid Potash Russ Draper, Sam Douglas, Boyd Elder, Clifton Ellis, Urs Peter Flueckiger, Curtis Francisco, William L. Fox, Hector Gallegos, Mary Lewis Garcia, Joel Glanzberg, David Gregor, Amy Hauft, Joan Jonas, Erik Knutzen, Eve Andree Laramee,  Lucy Lippard, Barry Lopez, Graciella Martinez, Susannah Mira, Onézieme Mouton, John Poch, Rob Ray, Lea Rekow, Ann Reynolds, Jack Risley, Lori Ryker, Jack Sanders, Michael Scialdone, Kathleen Shields, Susan Spring, John Stokes, Marianne Stockebrand, Deborah Stratman, Simone Swan,  Mary Tsiongas, Henry Walt, Blaine Young, and Joe Zuni.

References

 Kennedy, Randy. “The American West as Classroom, Art and Metaphor” New York Times (4 May 2011) p. C1 and C9 (full page). https://www.nytimes.com/2011/05/04/arts/design/land-arts-of-the-american-west-a-texas-tech-program.html
 Lippard, Lucy, William L. Fox, Bill Gilbert, and Kathleen Shields. Land/Art: New Mexico. Santa Fe: Radius Books; 2010. 
 Taylor, Chris and Bill Gilbert. Land Arts of the American West. Austin: University of Texas Press; 2009. 
 Taylor, Chris, Rodrigo Perez de Arce, Pilar Cereceda, William L. Fox, Gonzalo Pedraza, Andres Rivera, and Flora Vilches. Incubo: Atacama Lab. Santiago, Chile: INCUBO; 2008.
 Gilbert, Bill and Chris Taylor. Land Arts of the American West. Austin and Albuquerque: University of Texas at Austin and University of New Mexico; 2003.

External links
 
 UNM Land Arts of the American West program
 Texas Tech Land Arts of the American West Website

Land art
American contemporary art
Art schools in New Mexico
Art schools in Texas
Architecture schools in New Mexico
Architecture schools in Texas
Land management in the United States
Archaeological sites in the United States
Native American arts organizations
Pedagogy
Educational institutions established in 2000